"You Dreamer You" (also known as "Oh, What a Dream") is a song written and originally recorded by Johnny Cash.

The song was recorded by Cash on March 12, 1959" and released as his third Columbia single (Columbia 4-41371, with "Frankie's Man, Johnny" on the opposite side) in April 1959.

"You Dreamer You" made it to number 13 on the Billboard country chart, while "Frankie's Man, Johnny" reached number 9 on the country chart and number 57 on the Hot 100.

Charts

References 

Johnny Cash songs
1959 singles
Songs written by Johnny Cash
Sun Records singles
1959 songs